This article presents the filmography of Hong Kong film and television actress, producer and recording artist Charmaine Sheh.

Filmography

Films

TVB series

Mainland Chinese television series

External links 

Actress filmographies
Hong Kong filmographies
British filmographies